Drax may refer to:

Places
 Drax, North Yorkshire, a village and civil parish in the United Kingdom
 Drax Priory, a former Augustinian priory
 Drax Power Station, the largest power station in Britain

People
 Drax (surname), people with the surname

Fictional characters 
 Sir Hugo Drax, in the James Bond novel and film Moonraker
 Drax the Destroyer, a Marvel Comics character
 Infinity-Man, a DC Comics character also named "Drax"
 Drax (Time Lord), in the Doctor Who television series

Companies
 Drax Group, a British electrical power generation company